Rolf Bjorger Pettersen (7 January 1946 in Sarpsborg, Norway – 28 June 1981 in Prince George, Canada) was a Canadian cross-country skier who competed in the 1968 Winter Olympics.

References

1946 births
1981 deaths
Canadian male cross-country skiers
Olympic cross-country skiers of Canada
Cross-country skiers at the 1968 Winter Olympics
People from Sarpsborg
Norwegian emigrants to Canada